Honkala may refer to:

Cheri Honkala, US Green vice-presidential candidate in 2012
Leo Honkala, Finnish wrestler
Honkala Island, in Antarctica